King William Street is a street in the City of London, the historic nucleus and modern financial centre of London. It is a two-way street linking Lombard Street, at its northern end, with London Bridge, which marks the start of the start of the A3 route to Portsmouth.

Geography

King William Street runs from its northern end at a junction with Lombard Street by the church of St Mary Woolnoth, southeast to Monument junction, where it meets Gracechurch Street and Cannon Street. King William Street then continues south into London Bridge. The nearest London Underground stations are Bank and Monument; the former King William Street station was once sited on the road, at the corner of Monument Street.

The road was built between 1829 and 1835 and is named after the reigning monarch of the time, King William IV. In 1902 it was the scene of the fatal stabbing of Arthur Reginald Baker by his lover Kitty Byron, at an entrance to the Lombard Street post office which at that time was located on King William Street. Today, it houses a number of investment banks and City firms.

Notable buildings
 No. 1, was originally constructed as the head office of the London Assurance Corporation on the site of the first clubhouse of the Gresham Club. It has housed the Rothschild headquarters.
 Adelaide House, a Grade II listed building, is located at the far southern end of King William Street, adjacent to London Bridge. 
 Opposite and also adjacent to the bridge is Fish Hall, the livery hall of the Worshipful Company of Fishmongers.

In literature

King William Street is mentioned in T. S. Eliot's poem The Waste Land. Lines 60–68 read:

At the time he wrote this section, Eliot was working for a bank in the City.

See also
A3 road, the London to Portsmouth route which originates on King William Street
Bank junction, a major junction to the north of King William Street
Eastcheap, a road to the east of King William Street
St Clement Eastcheap, on Clement's Lane, off King William Street
St Magnus-the-Martyr, close to King William Street 
St Mary Abchurch, on Abchurch Lane, off King William Street

References

Streets in the City of London